Tyndall Park is a provincial electoral division in the Canadian province of Manitoba. It was created by redistribution in 2008 from parts of  Inkster, Wellington, and St. James electoral districts. The riding's population, according to the 2006 census, was 20,950. Following the 2018 Manitoba electoral redistribution, Tyndall Park is bordered to the east by Burrows, to the south by Notre Dame, to the north by The Maples, and to the west by the rural riding of Lakeside.

The riding contains the northwest Winnipeg neighbourhoods of Brooklands, Weston, and namesake Tyndall Park.

List of provincial representatives

Electoral results

References

Manitoba provincial electoral districts
Politics of Winnipeg